U.S. Route 7 (US 7) is a north–south United States Numbered Highway which runs  in the state of Connecticut. The route begins at Interstate 95 (I-95) in Norwalk starting out as an expressway until the Wilton town line. The route then proceeds north as a two-lane highway through Redding and Ridgefield until it reaches Danbury. The route becomes an expressway again, eventually merging with I-84 for a brief period before it turns and proceeds north with US 202 in Brookfield. The expressway section terminates at an intersection with US 202 at the Fairfield–Litchfield county line next to Candlewood lake. The route then continues north passing by New Milford as a two-lane highway to the Massachusetts border in North Canaan. US 7 was aligned to its current route around 1930, and, since then, three sections totaling around  have been upgraded to freeway standards.

Route description
US 7 in Connecticut is also known as Route 7, the Ethan Allen Highway (named after a Revolutionary general), and Super 7. It is mostly a surface road but has three short expressway sections in the Norwalk and Danbury areas. US 7 begins in Norwalk with a  expressway that runs nearly to the Wilton town line. There are three exits on this short section, signed as The Forty Third Infantry Division Memorial Highway, named after the 43rd Infantry Division. Exit 1, just past the southern terminus at I-95, leads to the Central Norwalk Business District and US 1. Exit 2 leads to Route 123 which extends from US 1 in Norwalk through the town of New Canaan to the New York state line. After exit 2, the expressway reduces to four lanes from six. Exit 3 leads to the Merritt Parkway (Route 15) southbound. This interchange was half built and only allows southbound access from the expressway; northbound access is gained via Route 123 at exit 2. Plans are being developed to eventually complete the interchange. The expressway section ends at Grist Mill Road in Norwalk, about  past exit 3.

This section is also signed as The Forty Third Infantry Division Memorial Highway. Through this section of expressway, I-84, US 7, US 6, and US 202 all run concurrently. On this section there are two exits. At exit 11, US 202 exits the expressway, and at exit 12, US 202 crosses back over US 7. On southbound US 7, the exit for I-84 eastbound is signed as exit 10. There is no exit number for I-84 west because of the concurrency. The US 7 expressway then bypasses Brookfield to the west and terminates at an intersection with US 202 at the Fairfield–Litchfield county line.

US 7 is cosigned with US 202 until central New Milford, where US 202 turns east with Route 67 while US 7 continues north. Recent construction has also made large parts of US 7 between the terminus of the expressway and New Milford a four-lane divided highway with at-grade intersections. North of New Milford center, US 7 remains a two-lane road through the rest of Connecticut. US 7 has a short  concurrency with US 44 in North Canaan before continuing north for another  to the Massachusetts state line.

History
The precursor to US 7 was New England Route 4 (Route 4). When US 7 was commissioned, it followed the whole route of Route 4. It entered Connecticut from the north in North Canaan and then followed Route 41 southwest to Sharon and into New York state. This alignment had US 7 follow New York State Route 22 (NY 22) to a southern terminus in New York City rather than in Norwalk. This southern terminus was shifted to Norwalk around 1930 and was rerouted onto other existing state highways of the time to get from Canaan to Norwalk. From Canaan to New Milford, the road was known as State Highway 134 and, from there to Danbury, was State Highway 128. From Danbury to Ridgefield, the road was part of another New England route, Route 3, which was paved in 1924. From Ridgefield to Norwalk was State Highway 126.

Early planning of the Interstate Highway System in the late 1940s and early 1950s envisioned an Interstate route (I-89) paralleling US 7 from Norwalk Connecticut to the Canadian border north of Burlington, Vermont. Connecticut's portion of this freeway was to have paralleled US 7 from Norwalk to Danbury, then follow I-84 around Danbury before branching off to the north and paralleling US 7 and US 202 to New Milford. North of New Milford, the proposed freeway would have continued northward paralleling US 7 through the remainder of Connecticut and into Massachusetts. Of the proposed freeway plan, the section from I-95 to Grist Mill Road in Norwalk, and the segment from Sleepy Hollow Road in Danbury to US 202 at the Brookfield–New Milford town line were built. Construction on the initial freeway segments in Norwalk began in 1969 and in Danbury and Brookfield in 1970, but lawsuits brought on by residents within the highway's path and environmental groups halted construction north of Route 123 in 1972. With an approved environmental impact statement, construction resumed in 1986 between Route 123 and Grist Mill Road in Norwalk and from I-84 to Sleepy Hollow Road in Danbury. The Danbury section opened in 1987, while the extension of the US 7 freeway to Grist Mill Road opened in 1992. Lack of funding and continued opposition to the freeway has prevented construction of the remainder of the proposed highway between Grist Mill Road and Danbury. Instead, from 2003 to 2008, the existing US 7 was widened from two to four lanes from Grist Mill Road to Wolfpit Road in Wilton and from the Route 35 intersection in Ridgefield to the freeway terminus at Sleepy Hollow Road in Danbury. The Connecticut Department of Transportation (CTDOT) has stated its intent to eventually extend the southern section of the US 7 freeway from Grist Mill Road in Norwalk to Route 33 in Wilton (approximately ), but no timetable or funding source has been defined for this project.

Construction on the section between I-84 and exit 12 began in 1974 and was completed in 1976. The Brookfield bypass segment between exit 12 and the current expressway terminus opened in November 2009, after two years of construction. The former US 7 route through Brookfield is now signed solely as US 202.

Exit list

References

External links

07
Transportation in Fairfield County, Connecticut
Transportation in Litchfield County, Connecticut
 Connecticut